HK NS Stars is an ice hockey club from Novi Sad, Serbia. The club has sections in junior divisions, categories U8 to U18. The players of the club that play hockey beyond the junior level tend to join senior clubs from Slovenia, Hungary and Serbia when they become adults.

Honours 

Serbian Hockey League U12
Winners (2): 2005, 2019
Serbian Hockey League U18
Winners (1): 2012

References 
HK NS Stars on SHLS (Serbian Ice Hockey Federation) website

External links 
 Website 
 Facebook Page
Twitter profile

Ice hockey teams in Serbia
Sport in Novi Sad
Serbian Hockey League teams